The West Africa Squadron, also known as the Preventative Squadron, was a squadron of the British Royal Navy whose goal was to suppress the Atlantic slave trade by patrolling the coast of West Africa. Formed in 1808 after the British Parliament passed the Slave Trade Act 1807 and based out of Portsmouth, England, it remained an independent command until 1856 and then again from 1866 to 1867.

The impact of the Squadron has been debated, with some commentators describing it as having a significant role in the ending of the slave trade and other commentators describing as being poorly resourced and plagued by corruption. Sailors in the Royal Navy considered it to be one of the worst postings due to the high levels of tropical disease. Over the course of its operations, it managed to capture around 6% of the transatlantic slave ships and freed around 150,000 Africans. Between 1830 and 1865, almost 1,600 sailors died during duty with the Squadron, principally of disease.

History 
On 25 March 1807 Britain formally abolished the slave trade, prohibiting British subjects from trading in slaves, crewing slave ships, sponsoring slave ships, or fitting out slave ships. The Act also included a clause allowing the seizure of ships without slave cargoes on board but equipped to trade in slaves. The task of enforcing the act was huge and challenging. In order to enforce this ruling in 1808 the Admiralty dispatched two vessels to police the African Coast. The small British force was empowered, in the context of the ongoing Napoleonic Wars, to stop any ship bearing the flag of an enemy nation, making suppression activities much easier. Portugal, however, was one of the largest slave trading nations and Britain's ally against France. In February 1810, under diplomatic pressure, Portugal signed a convention that allowed British ships to police Portuguese shipping, meaning Portugal could only trade in slaves from its own African possessions.

The privateer (a private vessel operating under a letter of marque) Dart, chasing slavers to profit from the bounties set by the British government, made the first captures under the 1810 convention. Dart, and in 1813 another privateer, (Kitty), were the only two vessels to pursue slavers for profit, and thus augment the efforts of the West Africa Squadron. The lack of private initiatives, and their short duration, suggest that they were not profitable.

With the ending of the Napoleonic Wars, Viscount Castlereagh had ensured a declaration against slavery appeared in the text of the Congress of Vienna, committing all signatories to the eventual abolition of the trade. In 1814, France agreed to cease trading, and Spain in 1817 agreed to cease North of the equator, adding to the mandate of the squadron. Early treaties against slave trading with foreign powers were often very weak. As a consequence, until 1835 the squadron could seize vessels only if slaves were found on board at the time of capture; it could not interfere with vessels clearly equipped for the slave trade but with no slaves on board. If slaves were found, a fine of £100 for each one could be levied, a large sum; some slaver captains in danger of being caught had their captives thrown overboard to reduce the fine.

In order to prosecute captured vessels and thereby allow the Navy to claim its prizes, a series of courts were established along the African Coast. In 1807, a Vice Admiralty Court was established in Freetown, Sierra Leone. In 1817, several Mixed Commission Courts were established, replacing the Vice Admiralty Court in Freetown. These Mixed Commission Courts had officials from both Britain and foreign powers, with Anglo-Portuguese, Anglo-Spanish, and Anglo-Dutch courts being established in Sierra Leone.

Far from the Pax Britannica style policing of the 1840s and 1850s, early efforts to suppress the slave trade were often ineffectual due to a desire to keep on good terms with other European powers. The actions of the West Africa Squadron were "strictly Governed" by the treaties, and officers could be punished for overstepping their authority.

Commodore Sir George Ralph Collier, with the 36-gun  as his flagship, was the first Commodore of the West Africa Squadron. On 19 September 1818, the navy sent him to the Gulf of Guinea with the orders: "You are to use every means in your power to prevent a continuance of the traffic in slaves." He served from 1818 to 1821.

In 1819, the Royal Navy created a naval station in West Africa at Freetown, the capital of the first British colony in West Africa, Sierra Leone. Most of the enslaved Africans freed by the squadron chose to settle in Sierra Leone, for fear of being re-enslaved if they were simply landed on the coast among strangers. From 1821, the squadron also used Ascension Island as a supply depot, before this moved to Cape Town in 1832.

As the Royal Navy began interdicting slave ships, the slavers responded by adopting faster ships, particularly Baltimore clippers. At first, the Royal Navy was often unable to catch these ships. However, when the Royal Navy started to use captured slaver clippers and new faster ships from Britain, the Royal Navy regained the upper hand. One of the most successful ships of the West Africa Squadron was such a captured ship, renamed . She successfully caught 11 slavers in one year.

The steamers were independent of the wind, and their shallow draught allowed them to patrol the shallow shores and rivers. In the middle of the 19th century, there were around 25 vessels and 2,000 personnel with a further 1,000 local sailors involved in the effort.

Britain pressed other nations into treaties that gave the Royal Navy the right to search their ships for slaves. As the 19th century wore on, the Royal Navy also began interdicting slave trading in North Africa, the Middle East, and the Indian Ocean.

The United States Navy assisted the West Africa Squadron, starting in 1820 with USS Cyane, which the US had captured from the Royal Navy in 1815. Initially the US contribution consisted of a few ships, which comprised the Africa Squadron after the Webster-Ashburton Treaty of 1842.

In 1867, the Cape of Good Hope Station absorbed the West Coast of Africa Station. In 1942 during World War II the West Africa Station was revived as an independent command until 1945.

Impact 
The West Africa Squadron seized approximately 1,600 ships involved in the slave trade and freed 150,000 slaves who were aboard these vessels between 1807 and 1860.

Robert Pape and Chaim Kaufmann have declared the Squadron the most expensive international moral action in modern history.

Liberated slaves 
While liberated slaves were returned to Africa, those who came from inland regions could not be returned to their place of origin. They often suffered in appalling conditions on the return voyage, or while waiting for courts to adjudicate their case. It is estimated as many as 25 percent of those who could not be returned to their place of origin died before being released.

Some freed slaves joined the Royal Navy or the West India Regiments. Also, 35,850 were recruited and transported to work in the West Indies, nominally as apprentices.

Criticism 
Howard W. French has argued that the impact of the Squadron has been overstated, calling it a "central prop" in encouraging a positive image of British history instead of "remorse or even meaningful dialogue about their slave-trading and plantation-operating past." A 2021 paper in the International Journal of Maritime History argued that, despite the enthusiasm of some individual commanders, "the Royal Navy was not wholly committed to ending the slave trade," stating that the Squadron "accounted for less than five per cent of the Royal Navy's warships, comprising a flotilla that was unfit and inadequate given the vast area under patrol."

Mary Wills of the Wilberforce Institute for the Study of Slavery and Emancipation, noted that the Squadron was "bound to ideas of humanitarianism but also increasing desires for expansion and intervention," and noted that it "depended on Africans for the day to day operation of their activities," notably the Kru people. John Rankin of East Tennessee State University has stated that "African and diaspora sailors made up one-fifth of shipboard personnel" and that Kru sailors "were self-organized into collectives, serving on board individual vessels under a single headman who functioned as an intermediary between the British naval and petty officers and his “Kroo.”"

Working conditions 
James Watt has written that crews of the Squadron "were exhausted by heavy rowing under extreme tropical conditions and exposed to fevers with sequelae from which they seldom recovered," and that it had significantly higher sickness and mortality rates than the rest of the Royal Navy.

Senior Officer, West Africa Squadron (1808-1815)
Post holders included:

In command of West Coast of Africa Station

Commodore, West Coast of Africa Station, (1818-1832)
Post holders included:

The West Coast of Africa station was merged with the Cape of Good Hope Station 1832-1841 and 1857-60 (Lloyd p68).

Commodore/Senior Officer, on the West Coast of Africa Station (1841-1867)
Post holders included:

From 1867, the commodore's post on the West Coast of Africa was abolished, and its functions absorbed by the senior officer at the Cape of Good Hope .

In popular culture
The West African Squadron is featured in Lona Manning's historical novels A Contrary Wind (2017) and A Marriage of Attachment (2018).

Patrick O'Brian centers the plot of his 1994 novel The Commodore, the seventeenth installment in his Aubrey–Maturin series, on his Royal Navy captain, Jack Aubrey, being given command of a squadron to suppress the slave trade off the coast of West Africa near the end of the War of the Sixth Coalition. Though the squadron is never explicitly named the "West Africa Squadron," it fulfills the known roles of the Squadron as it existed at the time, and makes reference to the Slave Trade Act of 1807.

William Joseph Cosens Lancaster, writing as Harry Collingwood, wrote four novels about the same squadron: 
 (1885)
 (1895)
 (1909)
 (1911)

See also
 Abolition of slavery timeline § 1800–1849
 African Slave Trade Patrol (United States Navy)
 Black and British: A Forgotten History#3: Moral Mission, a TV series covering the Squadron
 Blockade of Africa
 :Category:Ships of the West Africa Squadron
Mary Faber (slave trader)
Freetown, Sierra Leone, a town established for the settlement of freed slaves

References

Further reading 
*
 Access from UK with TV licence.
Chasing Freedom: The Royal Navy and the Suppression of the Transatlantic Slave Trade
The West African Squadron and slave trade
BBC News - "10 things about British slavery"
Hochschild, Adam. Bury the Chains: The British Struggle to Abolish Slavery. (London: Macmillan, 2005), 
Lloyd, Christopher. The Navy and the Slave Trade: The Suppression of the African Slave Trade in the Nineteenth Century. (Cass library of African studies, no. 4. London: Cass, 1968), OCLC: 177145
 
Naval Review book review of "BRITAIN’S WAR AGAINST THE SLAVE TRADE: THE OPERATIONS OF THE ROYAL NAVY’S WEST AFRICA SQUADRON 1807-1867"

 

 
Military units and formations established in 1808
African slave trade
19th century in the United Kingdom
Royal Navy squadrons
British West Africa
19th-century history of the Royal Navy
Slavery in the British Empire
Anti-slavery military operations